The Cherry Creek Rockshelter is an archaeological site in central Colorado, located within modern-day Castlewood Canyon State Park near
Franktown, Colorado. Current research indicates that it was used by Native American inhabitants beginning in the Archaic period. The site is situated on the Palmer Divide, which allowed for a unique prehistoric environment that contributed to an abundance of food and water sources, as well as lithic materials for tool-making. These factors, combined with the structure and situation of the shelter itself, made the site a particularly attractive environment for prehistoric peoples to settle in. Archaeological study of the site began in 1955, with the most current original research concluding in 2002.

Geography
The park and archaeological site are located within the northern reaches of the Black Forest, a relatively isolated area of montane forest surrounded by drier grasslands. This forest is nurtured by the increase in elevation provided by the Palmer Divide, which allows for a higher amount of precipitation than is typical for central Colorado. The site is situated on the western bank of Cherry Creek, a tributary of the South Platte River that flows north through the park. With its maximum exposure to the south, the shelter is in an ideal position to shield inhabitants from cold northern winds while allowing for abundant solar radiation to warm the site.

This area of Colorado has historically had a diverse ecosystem, with sources of abundant food, water, shelter, and lithic materials for stone tool manufacture. Such factors encouraged human settlement of the area.

This region experienced a notable diversity of floral and faunal species similar to those of the nearby Rocky Mountain foothills, but with a zonation of larger plants that differentiates the ecosystem of the Palmer Divide from similar environments. Prehistoric animal species included bison, antelope, deer, rabbits, and other animals that would have provided an abundant and diverse food source for native peoples. Nearby water sources included not only Cherry Creek, but also fresh water springs that occurred within the rockshelter and which contributed to the development of the site (Tchakirides 16-18).

The sedimentation of the area directly contributed to the formation of the rockshelter. The bedrock is composed of Denver and Dawson formations, deposited in the late Cretaceous to Paleogene, and overlaid with Castle Rock conglomerate. The Castle Rock conglomerate is harder than the relatively soft Denver and Dawson formations. Groundwater moving between these two major layers erodes the lower, softer formations and leaves the harder Castle Rock conglomerate behind. Where these layers form outcrops, the same groundwater erosion may produce natural caves as seen in the Cherry Creek rockshelter.

History
There is little direct evidence of Paleoindian use of the rockshelter. However, there is abundant evidence of human use from the Archaic period onward. During the Archaic, climates were beginning to shift from cool and wet to hotter, drier conditions. Such a shift in climate necessitated a shift in human behavior. This include changes in subsistence behavior with an increased focus on plant resources and a more sedentary lifestyle.

History of human use of site
This rockshelter would have been would have been a prime location for prehistoric occupation in every season but summer, thanks to its southern exposure that provided protection from harsh northern winds. The area also was abundant with floral and faunal resources, and a water source, Cherry Creek, was accessible as well, and the rockshelter itself had a fresh water spring. Outcrops in the area provided ample material for stone tools.

There is not any evidence for Paleoindian occupation at the Cherry Creek Canyon Rockshelter, although at the time the deepest horizons in the rockshelter had yet to be tested sufficiently  so there is still a possibility that these prehistoric people utilized the site. There is also a general lack of preservation in terms of organic remains and a shortage of well-defined stratigraphy which has made archaeology, and distinction between different occupational periods, difficult.

A large number of lithics, both debitage as well as projectile points, were discovered during Thompson's archaeological work at the site, suggesting that this rockshelter was a place of intense lithic production. He also excavated ground stones from some of the lower levels of the site, and ceramic sherds from the first four levels of his trench. Thompson concluded that the first four levels represented a Woodland phase occupation dated to about AD 500. He also concluded that the projectile points in the first four levels of his excavation were different from those in the bottom levels which further represented different occupations in different time periods.

This rockshelter represents the use of different areas for different tasks, as concluded by the discovery of hearths in Test Unit Three, and large amounts of lithic debitage in Test Unit One. There is also evidence of storage at the site, suggesting long term occupation, and continuous use of the site. Tchakirides' research at the site exemplifies that an intense occupation, at least during the Late Archaic/Early Ceramic transitional period, took place in the Cherry Creek Rockshelter. People during this time were enjoying a more sedentary lifestyle, and the longevity at the rockshelter supports this theory.

Archaeology
The first formal excavation done at the rockshelter was in 1955 and 1956 by Gerald Thompson, a University of Denver student. He excavated a 12x29 rectangular trench to the back of the rockshelter, with twelve arbitrary levels six inches deep (Tchakirides 26). From the records Thompson made, it appears that the rockshelter was utilized for a long period of time, but because of the minimal chronological evidence he provides, the total duration is unclear. What is important about his research is that he provides significant information to include in the prehistoric history of the area.

The most current research on the rockshelter began in the fall of 2000 when Tiffany Tchakirides, another University of Denver master's student, began her thesis research at the site. She conducted ground-penetrating radar (GPR) surveys in the rockshelter to attempt to identify undisturbed sediments at the site, the presence of which would mean an opportunity for further research. The hope was that the trench Thompson dug in the 1950s would be visible in the analysis of the data, but instead they discovered other intrusive events

In the spring of 2001 another GPR survey was done, this time with a different system in the hopes that the data produced could be used to plan future excavations. The first goal was to locate the trench Thompson had dug during his research in the rockshelter, then to locate sediments that remained undisturbed, and finally to excavate test units to recover data and integrate it with what Thompson had already written about. Tchakirides was able to identify several features in the radar profiles during her analysis, such as possible hearths, a bedrock ledge, and areas of a roof fall. The hope was that some of the features would have artifacts still in situ and after intensive analysis, five features were selected to be included in future excavations.

In the summer of 2001, excavations began at the rockshelter. Four test units were excavated in a period of two weeks. Test Unit One was placed in order to explore the bedrock ledge seen in the GPR data. They discovered a cache of lithic material that had been placed in the shelter for future tool work. Test Unit Two contained pothunter's pits and a portion of the original Thompson's trench. Test Unit Four was placed away from the original trench, where the hearths and other features identified in the GPR data were thought to be located. What they found was an ancient living surface, and they were not only able to correlate it with Thompson's data, but to date it to the Late Archaic and Early Ceramic periods.

In an attempt to clarify what was exposed in Test Unit Two, Test Unit Six was chosen to excavate. Unfortunately, Test Unit Six excavations revealed disturbed stratigraphy similar to Test Unit Two, so Test Unit Seven had to be excavated as well. Thompson's trench was then located and the team was finally able to place their newer ideas into the previous framework created by Thompson for the site. 1805 lithic pieces were excavated and statistical analysis was performed on the flakes to determine use area location during the most intense occupation period in the rockshelter. This, and the hearths in Test Unit Three, led the team to determine the spatial segregation of the rockshelter into various activity areas. The lithic artifacts found in Test Unit Three also demonstrated the different stages of production in stone tool making; for example, Test Unit Three lithics were determined to be of a later stage than Test Unit Four.

Conclusions
In conclusion, using all available data, it can be said that the Cherry Creek Canyon Rockshelter experienced intense occupation at least during the Late Archaic and Early Ceramic transition, and that the site was divided into activity areas that contained features like hearths and storage areas. Data from other sites suggests a similar pattern of sedentary living and intense occupation. Future research on unexcavated units, especially further back into the rockshelter, can only lead to discoveries about the occupation of the site, possibly during other time periods.

See also

 Franktown Cave, a nearby archaeological site
 List of prehistoric sites in Colorado

References

Bibliography
Tchakirides, Tiffany Forbes (2002) Ground-Penetrating Radar and Archaeology: An Integrative Approach for Studying the Cherry Creek Canyon Rockshelter. M.A. thesis, Department of Anthropology, University of Denver.

Archaeological sites in Colorado
Rock shelters in the United States